Rhinelepis aspera is a species of armored catfish native to Argentina, Brazil, and Uruguay, where it occurs in the São Francisco and upper Paraná River basins.  This species grows to a length of  TL.

References

 

Hypostominae
Fish of the São Francisco River basin
Fish of Argentina
Fish of Uruguay
Fish described in 1829